Nordland Township is a township in Aitkin County, Minnesota, United States. The population was 972 as of the 2010 census.

History
Nordland Township was named after Nordland, a county in Norway.  One property within the township is listed on the National Register of Historic Places: the 1897 Bethlehem Lutheran Church.

Geography

Major highway
  Minnesota State Highway 47

Lakes
 Edquist Lake
 Elm Island Lake
 Linde Lake
 Lingroth Lake
 Little Ripple Lake
 Lake Four
 Lone Lake
 Monson Lake
 Nord Lake
 Raspberry Lake
 Ripple Lake (vast majority)
 Section Twelve Lake
 Section Twenty-Five Lake
 Seth Lake (vast majority)
 Sisabagamah Lake (south half)
 Sissabagamah Lake
 Sixteen Lake
 Sjodin Lake
 Soderman Lakes
 Soderman Lakes (southeast three-quarters)
 Sweetman Lake
 Thirty-One Lake (west edge)
 Turtle Lake (west three-quarters)
 Wladimiraf Lake

Adjacent townships
 Spencer Township (north)
 Kimberly Township (northeast)
 Glen Township (east)
 Malmo Township (southeast)
 Wealthwood Township (south)
 Hazelton Township (southwest)
 Farm Island Township (west)
 Aitkin Township (northwest)

Cemeteries
The township contains these two cemeteries: Bethlehem Lutheran and Glory Baptist.

Demographics
As of the census of 2000, there were 853 people, 366 households, and 289 families residing in the township. The racial makeup of the township was 98.01% White, 0.35% African American, 0.70% Native American, 0.35% Asian, 0.23% from other races, and 0.35% from two or more races. Hispanic or Latino of any race were 0.35% of the population.

There were 366 households, out of which 23.0% had children under the age of 18 living with them, 73.0% were married couples living together, 3.6% had a female householder with no husband present, and 21.0% were non-families. 17.2% of all households were made up of individuals, and 9.3% had someone living alone who was 65 years of age or older.  The average household size was 2.33 and the average family size was 2.61.

In the township the population was spread out, with 19.0% under the age of 18, 3.2% from 18 to 24, 19.5% from 25 to 44, 34.5% from 45 to 64, and 23.9% who were 65 years of age or older.  The median age was 50 years. For every 100 females, there were 100.2 males.  For every 100 females age 18 and over, there were 97.4 males.

The median income for a household in the township was $41,172, and the median income for a family was $44,205. Males had a median income of $35,673 versus $20,313 for females. The per capita income for the township was $18,742.  About 4.5% of families and 7.6% of the population were below the poverty line, including 14.4% of those under age 18 and 8.3% of those age 65 or over.

References
 United States National Atlas
 United States Census Bureau 2007 TIGER/Line Shapefiles
 United States Board on Geographic Names (GNIS)

Townships in Aitkin County, Minnesota
Townships in Minnesota